Cannon Valley is a locality in the Whitsunday Region, Queensland, Australia.

History 
When town lots were sold in the coastal area 1904, the town name used was Cannonvale (which is now the neighbouring locality).

Cannon Valley State School opened in 1910, but in 1968 it was decided to relocate the school into Cannonvale as the majority of the students were coming from Cannonvale. The new school buildings in Cannonvale opened in July 1969 with 84 students and the school was then renamed Cannonvale State School.

Road infrastructure
The Proserpine-Shute Harbour Road (State Route 59) runs through from south to north.

References 

Whitsunday Region
Localities in Queensland